The Harscamp villa is a municipal monument on the Ringlaan in the Dutch town of Baarn in de province Utrecht. The villa is in the Wilhelminapark, a villa neighborhood which is part of a Rijksmonument.

The house was built in 1912 by shipping magnate L.P.D. Op ten Noort, co-founder of the Koninklijke Paketvaart Maatschappij. The slate-covered roof has a lantern on top, with a sailing vessel for a weather vane. The building's stained glass windows have sailing as a common motif. 

The symmetric front facade has a central porch with a curved roof. It had structures added on either side; a loggia on the right, and a sunroom on the left. Behind the building was a geometric garden.

Since 1938 the Harscamp is owned by the Salvation Army; for a long time it was in use as a children's home. In 2000, the building was renovated to become a home for unhoused people. A report from the town of Baarn from 2015 noted that the building had served drug addicts but had recently been closed; preparations were underway to make it an assisted living facility.

References

External links
Baarn, geschiedenis en architectuur, Fred Gaasbeek, Jan van ’t Hof en Maarten Koenders, Zeist 1994
 Photograph of the front, 1915-1920, from Utrecht Archives
Photograph of garden and back of house

Villas in the Netherlands